The Portuguese Legion was a Portuguese paramilitary state organization founded in 1936 during the Portuguese President of the council's António de Oliveira Salazar's right-wing dictatorship, the Estado Novo. It was dissolved by law on April 25, 1974.

Its stated objectives were to "defend the spiritual heritage [of Portugal]" and to "fight the communist threat and anarchism".

The Portuguese Legion was under the control of the Ministry of the Interior and War, and was responsible for coordinating civil defense in Portuguese territory, including in the Portuguese Empire. It was deeply involved in multiple collaborations with PIDE, the political police. They used the Roman salute and also used to shout the name of Salazar in their parades.

Membership
Membership in the Portuguese Legion was open to any person over 18 years of age.

Members of the Portuguese Legion were divided into three levels:
Escalão das Actividade Militares:  included legionaries from the ages of 18 to 45.
Escalão Privativo da DCT: Members 45 and older.
Escalão de Serviços Moderados: Only open to members over the age of 60.

Organisation

Naval Brigade
The Brigada Naval da LP was established on 5 December 1938, with the aim to revive maritime traditions of Portugal, and thus was affiliated to the Portuguese Navy. The Naval Brigade had a large amount of autonomy in relation to the rest of the Legion, having its own command and wearing a different uniform.

With the Naval Brigade as a reserve force for the Navy, its militia officers formed the Reserva Legionária (Reserva L) of the Navy.

The Naval Brigade was based at the Marinheiros Barracks in Alcântara, Lisbon – where it had a battalion and a band – and had detachments in Porto, Ponta Delgada and Angra do Heroísmo.

Oath
The official oath of the Portuguese Legion was:

In addition to the legionnaires, there were subscribers who were not members of the LP, but contributed to its financing.

Uniform

The uniform of the Portuguese Legion consisted of brown pants and a dolmã, a traditional Portuguese military tunic, a green shirt, and tie. In the Brigada Naval of the LP the trousers and dolmã were dark blue.

War Cry
The official war cry of the Portuguese Legion was:

See also
Provincial organization of volunteers and civil defence, equivalent in some colonies of the Portuguese Empire
Mocidade Portuguesa, the Estado Novo's youth organization
União Nacional, the Estado Novo's single party
Humberto Delgado
Yves Guérin-Sérac

Sources 

 ARAÚJO, Rui.  The Empire of Spies . Alfragide: Book Workshop, 2010
 RODRIGUES, Luís Nuno.  The Portuguese Legion: a new state militia (1936–1944) . Lisbon: Editorial Estampa, 1996. 
 SILVA, Joshua's.  Portuguese Legion: repressive force of fascism . Lisbon: Diabril Publisher 1975.

1936 establishments in Portugal
1974 disestablishments in Portugal
Anti-communist organizations
Government paramilitary forces
Military wings of fascist parties
Military units and formations established in 1936
Military units and formations disestablished in 1974
Military units and formations of the Cold War
Political repression
Political organisations based in Portugal
Estado Novo (Portugal)
Paramilitary organisations based in Portugal
Fascist organizations